Philippe Gérard Brood (20 July 1964 – 13 April 2000) was a Dutch politician of the People's Party for Freedom and Democracy (VVD). He served as a Member of the House of Representatives from 25 August 1998 until his death from a heart attack on 13 April 2000 in his office in the House of Representatives at the age of thirty-five.

Administrative law

References

External links
  Mr. Ph.G. (Philippe) Brood (Parlement & Politiek)

1964 births
2000 deaths
Dutch consultants
Dutch legal educators
Dutch political commentators
Members of the House of Representatives (Netherlands)
Leiden University alumni
Academic staff of Leiden University
Politicians from The Hague
People from Leiden
People's Party for Freedom and Democracy politicians